Pir-e Morad (also Romanized as Pīr-e Morād) is a village in Hashivar Rural District, in the Central District of Darab County, Fars Province, Iran. At the 2006 census, its population was 420, in 90 families.

References 

Populated places in Darab County